Kudafari (Dhivehi: ކުޑަފަރި) is one of the inhabited islands of Noonu Atoll.

History 

It is said that the first inhabitants of Kudafari were Black African slaves that were brought to the Maldives. Slaves were mostly brought during that period for work such as shipbuilding and toddy tapping. They were housed in the Galolhu district of Malé in a place known as Baburun Koshi. They were freed in Malé and subsequently settled in this Island and AA.Feridhoo. According to late historian Lutfi writing in Faiythoora, he says the Africans in Feridhoo were an offshoot of the slaves sent to Kudafari from Malé after Sultan Hadhi Hassan got angry at them. This was in the 15th century. The last slave transaction in Maldives happened during the 1830s as the Arab Slave Trade lasted longer than its Trans Atlantic counterpart. The islanders living today are descendants of these people, some even inter marrying local women from nearby islands. N.Kudafari and AA.Feridhoo are two known communities of African descent in Maldives. Similar communities exist in neighbouring Sri Lanka and India.

Geography

Kudafari's land is flat.

The average temperature . The average rainfall  millimeters per year.

Ecology 

"The 'Integrated Multi-Tropical Aquaculture Project' was envisaged to initiate a community-led cause to revive coral reefs. Being from a small island such as Kudafari, we see the effects of climate change every day. But despite the odds, the project made me believe in a future that we all can achieve."

Demography

Kudafari population : 807  D-6

Education
Kudafaree has a school.

Smart School Programme

As part of the government's programme to improve the standard of education in the country, President Mohamed Nasheed launched the smart school programme.  Kudafari School was inaugurated as the first Smart School under the programme.

Smart schools make use of information and communication technology and multimedia resources in the classrooms, in order to cater to the needs of all the students of different academic levels.

Notes

References

Islands of the Maldives